Hoseynabad Pol-e Abrish (also Romanized as Ḩoseynābād Pol-e Abrīsh; also known as Ḩoseynābād Pol-e Abrīsham) is a village in Kalat-e Hay-ye Sharqi Rural District, in the Central District of Meyami County, Semnan Province, Iran. At the 2006 census, its population was 138, in 31 families.

References 

Populated places in Meyami County